Wadebridge School is a coeducational secondary school with academy status, located in the town of Wadebridge, Cornwall, England. It has 1,235 pupils. The headteacher is Tina Yardley.

Facilities include gymnasium, tennis courts, football/rugby pitch, hockey pitch, basketball court, a squash court and heated swimming pool (part of Wadebridge Leisure Centre).

History

The school opened as Wadebridge Secondary Modern School in March 1957. The building was designed by F. K. Hicklin, county architect.

In 2004, the school gained specialist business and enterprise college status.

Wadebridge converted to academy status in April 2012.

In 2020, the school closed its sixth form.

A-Level results
In 2006 the school came in second place behind Truro High School in the league tables for the average A-level points score per student in Cornwall. This meant that Wadebridge School beat the independent and selective Truro School into third place, a feat that was achieved again in 2008.

Ofsted inspections

As of 2021, the school's most recent inspection by Ofsted was in 2019, with a judgement of Good.

Notable former pupils 
Olly Barkley, England rugby international
Michaela Breeze, weightlifting Commonwealth champion
Jago, children's book illustrator
Calum Jarvis, swimming Commonwealth bronze medallist, Olympic Gold 2020(2021)
Tristan Stephenson, mixologist and bartender
Annabel Vernon, World Champion GB rower

References

External links

 

Secondary schools in Cornwall
Educational institutions established in 1957
Academies in Cornwall
1957 establishments in England
Wadebridge